Rowan Ricardo Phillips (born 1974 in New York City) is an American poet and writer.

He is the author of the poetry collections The Ground (2012), Heaven (2015), and Living Weapon (2020), the non-fiction books When Blackness Rhymes with Blackness and The Circuit: A Tennis Odyssey, and a translation from the Catalan of Salvador Espriu's short-story collection Ariadne in the Grotesque Labyrinth.

Phillips has been the recipient of a Whiting Award, a Guggenheim Fellowship, the Anisfield-Wolf Book Award, and the Nicolás Guillén Outstanding Book Prize. He won the PEN/Joyce Osterweil Award for Poetry in 2013 and the PEN/ESPN Award for Literary Sportswriting in 2019.

Phillips was one of 32 poets, novelists, playwrights, and short story writers "essential to how we understand our country and its place in the world right now" featured in the 2018 New York Times Style Magazine article and video project "Black Male Writers of Our Time."

Life
Phillips was born in New York City and grew up in the Bronx. His parents are from Antigua and Barbuda. He graduated from Hunter College High School and Swarthmore College and has a doctorate in English Literature from Brown University.

Phillips teaches Creative Writing at Princeton. He is a Professor of English at Stony Brook University. He has previously taught at Harvard, Columbia, Williams, NYU, and Baruch College. He lives in New York City and Barcelona with his wife and two daughters.

Phillips is President of the Board of the New York Institute for the Humanities. He is also a member of the Board of Aspen Words.

Phillips is a supporter, and club member, of FC Barcelona.

Writing 
Phillips's first three books of poems––The Ground, Heaven, and Living Weapon––can be read as a poetry trilogy. The poet Henri Cole wrote, "Like all good poets, Rowan Ricardo Phillips writes from a zone of his own creation, mixing the traditions of his West Indian ancestry with American poetry. He is a hopeful poet, a rising star." Phillips's poems engage such topics as the role of the imagination in human experience, the power of the sublime, the ubiquity of beauty, the history of literature, the necessity of translation, U.S. history, racism, colonialism, police violence, capitalism, and the Black Lives Matter movement. Through all of these subjects, Phillips's work meditates on the role of the poem and the poet, referencing poetic tradition from Greek mythology through centuries of English and American verse. Poet and scholar Evie Shockley writes of The Ground that Phillips's poems “carry the authoritative descriptions and rhythms of Walcott, the philosophical and symbolic flights of Stevens, the subtle humor and cosmopolitanism of Dove, but in a language whose musical blend of the contemporary and the timeless is all Phillips’s own. These poems assert cycles—they repeat, recur, and return—but where we end up is not where we started.” The Trinidadian poet and writer Andre Bagoo said of the Phillips trilogy: “Look closely and you can see major moments in US history informing his three collections. The Ground (2012) fell under in the shadow of 9/11; Heaven (2015) under the presidency of Barack Obama; and now the final part of this informal trinity, Living Weapon (2020) comes in the age of Donald Trump and COVID-19.” In a 2021 review of Living Weapon for The Guardian, David Wheatley writes that “Phillips’s determination to push beyond irony into affirmation is an audacious gesture – 'resilient as bioluminescence', these poems of 'song and pain' announce a bold new talent.”

Phillips is the author of a book of literary criticism on African American poetry, When Blackness Rhymes with Blackness (2010), and a translation from the Catalan of Salvador Espriu’s story collection Ariadne in the Grotesque Labyrinth (2012).

Phillips is known for his sportswriting on tennis, soccer, basketball, and baseball. He has contributed writing on sports to The New York Times Magazine, The New Yorker, The New Republic and the Paris Review. About his book The Circuit: A Tennis Odyssey, which won the PEN/ESPN Award for Literary Sportswriting in 2019, the novelist John Green writes, “As sports writing goes, The Circuit is unusual in the very best way. Rowan Ricardo Phillips writes with such fluidity, and packs the book with bursts of brilliance. This is a compulsively readable guide to one truly Homeric year of professional tennis.” The book follows the 2017 men's ATP Tour, featuring players Roger Federer, Rafael Nadal, Andy Murray, Novak Djokovic, David Goffin, and Albert Ramos Viñolas. Writing for The New York Times, Geoff Macdonald describes the book as “a poet’s love song to the game of tennis.” Phillips's writing on basketball has been collected by the Library of America. His soccer writing has been praised by English soccer star and sports commentator Gary Lineker.

Phillips wrote a screenplay for a biopic of baseball icon Roberto Clemente adapted from the David Maraniss biography Clemente: The Passion and Grace of Baseball’s Last Hero. The film is set to be directed by Ezra Edelman.

His poem “Heralds of Delicioso Coco Helado” was adapted into the song “Coco Helado” by Spanglish Fly featuring Phillips performing his poem. It appeared in Spike Lee’s Netflix series She’s Gotta Have It.

Awards and honors
2019 Nicolás Guillén Outstanding Book Award for Heaven, given by the Caribbean Philosophical Association
2019 PEN/ESPN Award for Literary Sports Writing for The Circuit: A Tennis Odyssey2012 Los Angeles Times Book Prize finalist for poetry, for The Ground
2016 Anisfield-Wolf Book Award for "Heaven"
2016 Griffin Poetry Prize shortlist for Heaven
2015 Guggenheim Fellow
2013 Great Lakes Colleges Association New Writers Award winner for poetry, for The Ground
2013 NAACP Image Award finalist for Outstanding Literary Work, Poetry, for The Ground
2013 PEN/Joyce Osterweil Award for Poetry winner, for The Ground
2013 Whiting Award winner for poetry

Bibliography
Poetry

Living Weapon: Poems. Farrar, Straus and Giroux. 2020. .
"Violins." African American Poetry: 250 Years of Struggle and Song, edited by Kevin Young. Library of America. 2020. .
Criticism
 
Translation 
 

Nonfiction

 The Circuit: A Tennis Odyssey. Farrar, Straus and Giroux. 2018. .

References

External links
http://www.rowanricardophillips.com/about
http://www.stonybrook.edu/commcms/english/people/faculty/phillips/main.html
http://www.poetrysociety.org/psa/poetry/crossroads/own_words/Rowan_Ricardo_Phillips/
http://heymancenter.org/people/rowan-ricardo-phillips/
http://www.whiting.org/awards/winners/rowan-ricardo-phillips#/

Biography, poetry excerpts from Griffin Poetry Prize website

1974 births
American male poets
Writers from New York City
Swarthmore College alumni
Brown University alumni
Living people
21st-century American poets
21st-century American male writers